Renée Felice Smith (born January 16, 1985) is an American actress. She is known for portraying Nell Jones on NCIS: Los Angeles, since joining the series in 2010.

Early life
Smith was born in New York City of mixed Irish-Italian descent. She attended Patchogue-Medford High School on Long Island, New York, as well as the Tisch School of the Arts at New York University, graduating with honors, double majoring in journalism and minoring in history, Stonestreet Studios Conservatory and the Lee Strasberg Institute.

While at NYU, she co-created the student dance troupe, Pulse Dance Project.

Career
Smith's first acting job was a national television commercial for Dannon yogurt in 1991 at age six.

Smith started off in theatre, having made her debut in Second Stage's Wildflower. She was cast for a sitcom on The CW directed by Amy Sherman-Palladino, tentatively titled Wyoming, but only a pilot was produced since the project was not picked up by the network. The pilot movie is called The Wyoming Story.

In 2010, Smith was cast to appear as Nell Jones on NCIS: Los Angeles. Initially planned to be only a recurring character, Smith's role was expanded to main cast after she impressed the producers with her acting.

In 2011, Smith appeared as a supporting character, Missy, in Detachment.

In 2012, Smith began co-creating a children's book series based on her French bulldog, Hugo.

In April 2014, Smith starred as Frankie in Code Academy, a short sci-fi production in which young men and women are kept apart until a certain age.

In April 2015, Smith starred in and produced the short film, Baby, which premiered at SXSW Film Festival.

Smith appeared in the March 1, 2017, episode of It's Always Sunny in Philadelphia titled "A Cricket's Tale".

Smith and C.A. Gabriel co-directed their first feature film, The Relationtrip (2017), which premiered at SXSW in March 2017.

In 2020, Smith and her partner, Chris Gabriel, sold a television pilot to FX.

March 2021, Smith and her partner, Chris Gabriel, released their first picture book entitled, "Hugo and the Impossible Thing" inspired by their real life French Bulldog, Hugo.

Filmography

References

External links

 Renée Felice Smith on Twitter
 What Is Renee Felice Smith Doing Now

1985 births
21st-century American actresses
Actresses from New York City
American film actresses
American people of Irish descent
American people of Italian descent
American television actresses
Lee Strasberg Theatre and Film Institute alumni
Living people
People from Long Island
Tisch School of the Arts alumni